The 1975 President's Cup Football Tournament was the fifth competition of Korea Cup. The competition was held from 10 to 22 May 1975, and was won by South Korea for the third time, who defeated Burma in the final.

Group allocation matches

Group stage

Group A

Group B

Knockout stage

Bracket

Semi-finals

Third place play-off

Final

See also
Korea Cup
South Korea national football team results

External links
 President Park's Cup 1975 (South Korea) at RSSSF

1975